Rodrigo Alejandro Paillaqueo Muñoz (born 30 May 1987) is a Chilean footballer that currently plays for Deportes Santa Cruz in the Chilean Second Division (Chilean third-tier).

Honours

Club
Magallanes
 Tercera División de Chile: 2010
 Copa Chile: Runner-up 2011

External links
 
 

1987 births
Living people
Chilean people of Mapuche descent
Mapuche sportspeople
Indigenous sportspeople of the Americas
Chilean Primera División players
Primera B de Chile players
Chilean footballers
Colo-Colo footballers
Coquimbo Unido footballers
Magallanes footballers
Unión La Calera footballers
San Antonio Unido footballers
Association football goalkeepers